This is a list of Rutgers Scarlet Knights football players in the NFL draft.

Key

Selections

References

External links

 

Rutgers

Rutgers Scarlet Knights NFL draft